A provincial by-election was held in Prince Edward Island on October 15, 2007, to fill the vacancy in the Legislative Assembly riding of Belfast-Murray River. It was called by Premier Robert Ghiz on September 17, 2007.

The by-election was caused by the decision of PC MLA and former Premier Pat Binns to resign after he was appointed ambassador to the Republic of Ireland by Stephen Harper, following his election loss in the 2007 provincial election.

The Liberal candidate was Charlie McGeoghegan, who had come within 400 votes of defeating Binns in the provincial election. The PC candidate was chosen on September 21, 2007, while both the NDP and the Greens had announced their candidates, as well; a former Liberal ran as an independent.

McGeoghegan won the byelection, defeating Progressive Conservative Darlene Compton by over 400 votes.

Results

References

2007 elections in Canada
2007 in Prince Edward Island
Provincial by-elections in Prince Edward Island